The Rock is a football stadium based in Rhosymedre, Wales. It is the currently the home stadium for Cymru North teams Cefn Druids and Gresford Athletic FC, as well as Ardal Leagues team Cefn Albion.

In March 2009 planning permission was granted to demolish Cefn's old stadium, Plaskynaston Lane, and replace it with a Tesco supermarket. Delays to the beginning of construction put the project back by 12 months and the club moved into the new stadium in August 2010.

Cefn Druids and Gresford Athletic announced in March 2023 that they had signed a multi-year agreement to groundshare at the stadium, effective immediately and during at least the 23/24 season.

Facilities

The new complex at Rhosymedre includes a 512-seat stand, a club house and a television gantry. As it is sited in a disused quarry, one side of the stadium features a sheer rock wall. In 2016, a 3G pitch was installed at the stadium.

Attendances

The record attendance at the stadium was set in June 2017 as 1,854 attended a friendly against Wrexham. The record attendance for a regular season league game at The Rock is 662 for a game against TNS. A Europa League play off game against Cardiff Met in May 2018 attracted a crowd of 779 supporters.

References

External links 
 The Rock at Cefn Druid's official site

Football venues in Wales
Wrexham
Stadiums in Wrexham